Desanka Perović-Pešut (14 October 1941 – 8 June 2021) was a Serbian sport shooter. She was born in Vrbas. She competed at the 1976 Summer Olympics for Yugoslavia. At the 1970 World Championships in Phoenix, United States, she won one gold and two silver medals and received a golden badge for the best athlete of Yugoslavia of that year.

References

1941 births
2021 deaths
People from Vrbas, Serbia
Serbian female sport shooters
Yugoslav female sport shooters
Olympic shooters of Yugoslavia
Shooters at the 1976 Summer Olympics